The 2000 Russian Figure Skating Championships took place in Moscow from December 23 to 25, 1999. Skaters competed in the disciplines of men's singles, ladies' singles, pair skating, and ice dancing. The results were one of the criteria used to pick the Russian teams to the 2000 World Championships and the 2000 European Championships.

Senior results

Men

Ladies

Pairs

Ice dancing

External links
 results

1999 in figure skating
Russian Figure Skating Championships, 2000
Figure skating
Russian Figure Skating Championships
December 1999 sports events in Russia